Hans Rickheit (born January 12, 1973) is an American cartoonist.

Biography
Rickheit was originally a resident of Ashburnham, Massachusetts. He originally self-published minicomics which presented dark vignettes and short stories, many of them directly inspired by dreams. He also produced short films, mostly through community television stations.

Rickheit followed these up with a longer work, Kill, Kill, Kill. In the late 1990s, Rickheit moved to the Boston area where he was deeply involved with the Zeitgeist Gallery located in Cambridge, Massachusetts. With the support and assistance of the gallery's owner, Alan Nidle, he started a publication the short-lived publication Cambridge Inferno for more general audiences as a vehicle to showcase local cartoonists. He was also the gallery's projectionist, and programmed series' and comics festivals there and in the greater Boston area. He also dabbled in music and performance art, playing "Doctor Selenium" in a performance collaboration with musician Katt Hernandez, and working on Empire S.N.A.F.U. Restoration Project events.

In 2001, he self-published the first edition of his original graphic novel Chloe. A Xeric Foundation grant enabled him to produce a second and revised trade paperback edition of Chloe which received wider distribution and favorable reviews by the comics press. In 2003, Rickheit produced a color wraparound cover for the zine The Comics Interpreter, which in that issue also published a long interview with him. More recently, Rickheit has had short stories published in a number of alternative small press comics anthologies and periodicals and in The Stranger weekly.

Rickheit relocated in Philadelphia after the Zeitgeist Gallery shut down in 2006, where he still released the occasional issue of Chrome Fetus, his showcase for his own shorter works. From 2001 to 2009 he made performance art and designed album cover art for Katt Hernandez, as well as designing cover art for Psychotic Quartet and most recently Archer Spade. The Squirrel Machine is his longest graphic novel to date. It was published by Fantagraphics Books in 2009 and subsequently translated into several languages.

In early 2010, he returned to rural Massachusetts to live in a town so remote that it does not exist on most maps. He presently creates Ectopiary and Cochlea and Eustachia, both webcomics released semi-irregularly. Folly, a collection of his earlier short works, was released by Fantagraphics Books in April 2012.

References
 Biography

External links
 Ectopiary webcomic
 Cochlea and Eustachia webcomic
 Hans Rickheit at Home a video at Fantagraphics.com
 Katt Hernandez: Unlovely an album covered designed by Rickheit

American cartoonists
American comics artists
American performance artists
American webcomic creators
American comics writers
1973 births
Living people
People from Ashburnham, Massachusetts
Alternative cartoonists